Bingo Blitz is a freemium online board and card game released by Playtika which was published in August 2012 and is available for Facebook, iOS, Android, and Microsoft Windows.

History 
Bingo Blitz was initially developed for Facebook in 2010 in Santa Monica, California by Buffalo Studios. By 2011, Bingo Blitz had over 1 million active monthly players, and was the top rated online bingo game on Facebook and one of the top 10 most popular games on Facebook. Buffalo Studios was acquired by Caesars Entertainment in 2011, for nearly $100 million. Caesars Entertainment, which purchased Playtika in 2011, moved the game to be managed by Playtika in 2012 and it was published on IOS and Android. In 2014, Bingo Blitz entered Facebook's Hall of Fame Games.

Since 2016, Bingo Blitz has grown its revenue by 410% and its daily playing users by over 300%. As of 2019, Bingo Blitz has over a million daily active players worldwide. In 2020, Bingo Blitz had record revenue, since its launch, of $443 million, up 38% from 2019. Bingo Blitz is Playtika's flagship game, and is one of the 100 top-grossing mobile games on Apple and Android devices.

Bingo Blitz is currently (2021) the top-grossing board game app in the United States on the App Store and Google Play.

Gameplay 
In the game, each player picks a virtual room, and the play passes through multiple cities around the world. Players compete in an online bingo match when each game combines cases and stories related to the country in which players are located. To start playing you will need to choose a city in which you want to play (doesn't have to be your location) and then you will be entered into a bingo room in that city.  The bingo cards at Bingo Blitz are made up of 24 random numbers across five rows and columns. When the game begins you need to keep an eye out for your numbers to appear so you can cross them off your card. To call bingo depends on what the winning pattern is for that particular round.

The winning patterns in the game are a vertical, horizontal or a diagonal line, or all four corners. Bingo Blitz contains Power-Ups that help you reach a bingo. The cards also contain Bonus Squares that award you with additional in-game prizes when you manage to mark them off. A full game of Bingo Blitz could have anywhere between 10 and 15 rounds. The players needs to use credits to buy more than one bingo card per round to amp up their chances of getting bingo. Generally the type of bingo on offer is the classic 75 ball bingo but there are other types that crop up with the changing seasons.

Game rooms and events 
Map rooms are the main rooms, in which players travel across cities on the world map and play online bingo matches, where they can earn various elements. Once the players combine all of the required elements, that are related to that city, they move on to the next city. Additionally, there are seasonal rooms that changes theme every other week. Every week, Bingo Blitz creates a different event that usually relates to holidays or special occasions, allowing players to collect special elements.

Donations 
In April 2020, Bingo Blitz donated one million meals for people affected by the COVID-19 pandemic in the United States. The meals were provided by the charity Feeding America. 10 meals were donated for every virtual meal prepared by Bingo Blitz players through playing the game.

References

External links 
 Bingo Blitz official Facebook page

2012 video games
Android (operating system) games
Bingo
Facebook games
Free-to-play video games
Casino video games
IOS games
Video games developed in Israel
2012 establishments in Israel